WJUP-LP (103.9 FM) is a radio station licensed to Jupiter, Florida, United States. The station is currently owned by Jupiter Community Radio.

References

External links
 

JUP-LP
JUP-LP